Austracris is a genus of Orthoptera: Caeliferan insect in the family Acrididae: subfamily Cyrtacanthacridinae.  It includes an Australian pest, the spur-throated locust.

Species
The Orthoptera Species File and Catalogue of Life lists:
Austracris basalis (Walker, 1870)
Austracris eximia (Sjöstedt, 1931)
Austracris guttulosa (Walker, 1870) - type species (as Cyrtacanthacris guttulosa Walker, F)
Austracris proxima (Walker, 1870)

Gallery

References

External links 
 
 

Acrididae
Caelifera
Acrididae genera
Taxa named by Boris Uvarov